Cistogaster globosa is a European species of fly in the family Tachinidae.

Distribution
Europe, Russia, Transcaucasia, Kazakhstan, Mongolia.

References

Phasiinae
Diptera of Europe
Diptera of Asia
Insects described in 1775
Taxa named by Johan Christian Fabricius